Oulun Kärpät (Finnish for "Oulu Ermines", sometimes referred to as Kärpät Oulu) is a Finnish professional ice hockey team based in Oulu and playing in the top-tier Finnish Liiga.  Kärpät have won the Finnish championship title eight times, and is the most successful Finnish ice hockey team in the 21st century.

History

Early years
In the spring of 1946, three young men decided to found a new sports club in Oulu.  At the constitutional meeting on May 15, 1946, the club was named "Oulun Kärpät 46".  At first, Kärpät played football (soccer) and its first winter sport was bandy.

In the first annual meeting in January 1947, an ice hockey section was established.  At the beginning of the new decade, Kärpät was somewhat successful in ice hockey and it became the main sport of the club.  The first game at the highest level, then known as "SM-sarja" was played on the December 4, 1960, against HJK of Helsinki, but the visit to the highest level was short and Kärpät lost their position in the series.  They made it to the highest level again in 1965–66, but again lost their position.  The third attempt in 1967–68 did not produce a better performance, as Kärpät lost all their games.

From the first years onward, Kärpät placed emphasis on working with junior players. The team's E-juniors won the first Finnish championship in 1971.

Promotion and early SM-liiga years
When the SM-liiga was founded in August 1975, Kärpät were still playing level below in the first division. The team earned promotion to the elite league after the 1976–77 season. In their debut season in SM-liiga, Kärpät managed to finish seventh out of ten teams. During their second season in the top level in 1978–79, however, the team struggled and finished last in the regular season, but proved victorious in the relegation league and retained their place in the top league. On the positive side, Kärpät's Kari Jalonen was awarded Jarmo Wasama memorial trophy for the best rookie in league after the season.

Success in the 1980s
After having avoided relegation, Kärpät acquired more skilled players, such as Mikko Leinonen. The team's performance greatly improved, and in the 1979–80 season Kärpät made it to the playoffs where they proved victorious in the bronze medal game. This marked the first time when Kärpät claimed a medal on the national level. The emergence of young players was continued by Pekka Arbelius who was titled rookie of the year.

In the following season, 1980–81, Kärpät finished third in the regular series, and in the play-offs fought their way to the final series where they would face Tappara. Tappara started the best-out-of-five series in a strong manner, for instance by winning the third game by a score of 13–2. After this devastating loss the series was 2–1 for Tappara. Regardless, the Kärpät head coach Kari Mäkinen managed to boost the team's morale, and consequently Kärpät won two consecutive games by scores of 6–1 and 5–2, respectively. Thus, Kärpät clinched the series 3–2 and celebrated the first title for the franchise. The winning goal was scored by Kari Suoraniemi, and Kari Jalonen was named the MVP of the playoffs.

Before the 1981–82 season, a number of key players' contracts expired and they decided to continue their careers elsewhere. To illustrate, the team lost key and core players such as Jalonen, Suoraniemi, Leinonen and Kai Suikkanen, as well as cult player Reijo Ruotsalainen. With a weakened roster, Kärpät had to settle for fifth place. and the following year, they were nearly relegated. During the era of Pentti Matikainen as a head coach, Kärpät remained a championship contender and won bronze medals in three consecutive years (1983–84, 1984–85 and 1985–86). In Matikainen's last season as a coach, in 1986–87, Kärpät somewhat surprisingly won the regular season, but lost to Tappara in the finals. Matikainen was replaced by Kari Mäkinen in 1987–88, but the team failed to make the play-offs. Esko Nokelainen was named as the new coach, but to little avail. In the following season, in 1988–89, Kärpät reached a nadir and Nokelainen was sacked mid-season. Eventually, Kärpät were relegated from the SM-liiga as they lost to Jokerit in the relegation league.

Bankruptcy and lower divisions
The goal was to rise again shortly, but it did not work out. Due to financial constraints, Kärpät went into bankruptcy, but in the fall of 1995, they made it to the first division again. In the first year, they came eighth and lost in the playoffs. The next year, they went against KalPa for a place in the league, but ultimately lost. In the following year, they again lost to KalPa. For the 1998–99 season, Kärpät acquired coach Juhani Tamminen. After they played very well in the regular series, they lost to TuTo in the playoffs.

Return to the elite league

The next year, Kärpät finally qualified to the SM-liiga by beating Lahti Pelicans in the qualification series. The first season in the elite league was full of ups-and-downs, but Kärpät finished fourth and sixth in successive seasons. They then finally made it to the finals in, but lost to Tappara, similar to in 1987. In the 2003–04 season, Kärpät played in the finals against TPS and finally won their second Finnish Championship. In 2004–05, Kärpät won the Finnish Championship again when they defeated Jokerit in the finals, winning the best-of-five series 3–1. They retained the championship title in the 2006–07 season by beating Jokerit in the finals (3–0) and winning all their games in the playoffs. The first three championships of the 2000s have been celebrated in Oulu with feasts, each gathering tens of thousands of people to rejoice. In the 2007–08 season, the organization won its second consecutive championship title, and the fourth within the last five years, by defeating Espoo Blues in the finals, 4–1.

After a six-year lull, Kärpät returned to the top of Finnish ice hockey under the guidance of Lauri Marjamäki, by winning two consecutive championship titles in the 2013–14 and 2014–15 seasons. In both occasions, the team defeated Tappara in the play-off finals. Consequently, the team's Liiga championships tally was taken to seven. In the 2015–16 season Kärpät failed to defend the championship title, but were able to win the bronze medal game. In the same season, Kärpät finished runners-up in the 2015–16 Champions Hockey League losing 2–1 in the final to Sweden's Frölunda HC.

Honours

Champions
 SM-liiga Kanada-malja (8): 1981, 2004, 2005, 2007, 2008, 2014, 2015, 2018

 Finnish Liiga A-juniors (U20) (4): 1979, 1985, 2010, 2019

Runners-up
 SM-liiga (4): 1987, 2003, 2009, 2019
 SM-liiga (6): 1980, 1984, 1985, 1986, 2006, 2016

International
Champions Hockey League:
 Runner-up (1): 2016
IIHF European Champions Cup:
 Runner-up (2): 2005, 2006 
Nordic Trophy:
 Champion (1): 2007
Tampere Cup:
 Champion (1): 2003
Other awards for the club:
Harry Lindblad trophy (SM-Liiga regular season winner, since 1975): 1987, 2005, 2006, 2007, 2008, 2013, 2014, 2015, 2018, 2019, 2020.
I-Divisioona winner (it was the second level of ice hockey in Finland): 1976–77, 1996–97, 1997–98, 1998–99, 1999–00

Players

Current roster

Retired numbers
5   Lasse Kukkonen
6   Ilkka Mikkola
10   Reijo Ruotsalainen
15   Markku Kiimalainen
24   Jari Viuhkola

NHL alumni

  Sebastian Aho (2014–2016)
  Jonas Andersson (2008–2009)
  Johan Backlund (2012–2013)
  Niklas Bäckström (2002–2006)
  Drew Bannister (2002–2003)
  Josef Boumedienne (2004–2005, 2006–2007, 2013)
  Andy Chiodo (2008)
  Daniel Corso (2008–2009)
  Toni Dahlman (2008–2009)
  Evgeny Davydov (2001)
  Jason Dawe (2003)
  Jason Demers (2012–2013)
  Joonas Donskoi (2009–2015)
  Mikael Granlund (2009)
  Kari Haakana (2008)
  Niklas Hagman (1999–2001, 2016–2017)
  Jeff Hamilton (2001–2002)
  Jonathan Hedström (2010)
  Ivan Huml (2011–2016)
  Hannes Hyvönen (1993–1994, 2006–2008)
  Kari Jalonen (1978–1982, 1985–1987, 1993)
  Martti Järventie (2008–2009)
  Jussi Jokinen (2001–2005, 2012–2013, 2019-present)
  Jere Karalahti (2007)
  Lukáš Kašpar (2009–2010)
  Kamil Kreps (2010–2011)
  Lasse Kukkonen (1999–2003, 2004–2006, 2013–present)
  Mikko Lehtonen (1999–2006, 2007–2008, 2009–2014)
  Ross Lupaschuk (2006–2007)
  Ivan Majesky (2006–2007)
  Zdeněk Nedvěd (2004)
  Janne Niinimaa (1991–1993, 2004–2005)
  Markus Nutivaara (2014–2016)
  Michael Nylander (2004)
  Janne Pesonen (2001–2008)
  Lasse Pirjetä (1991–1993, 2001–2002)
  Esa Pirnes (1995–1999, 2014–2016)
  Joni Pitkänen (2000–2003)
  Tomáš Plíhal (2012–2013)
  Jesse Puljujärvi (2014–2016, 2019–2020)
  Mika Pyörälä (2001–2007, 2013–2017)
  Pekka Rinne (2003–2005)
  Pavel Rosa (2009–2011)
  Reijo Ruotsalainen (1975–1981, 1993, 1996–1998)
  Martin St. Pierre (2010)
  Denis Shvidki (2009)
  Ilkka Sinisalo (1993–1994)
  Brad Smyth (2003–2004)
  Jozef Stümpel (2012)
  Kai Suikkanen (1976–1981, 1983–1990)
  Petr Tenkrát (2002–2006, 2010–2011)
  Tim Thomas (2001–2002)
  Kyle Turris (2012)
  Dmitri Yushkevich (2009–2010)

See also
 2014–15 Oulun Kärpät season

References

External links

Kärpät official website 
Kärpät junior official website 
Kärpät official fan club
 Meltzer, Bill. NHL.com 'Across the Pond', article about Kärpät

Sport in Oulu
Liiga teams
1946 establishments in Finland
Liiga